The 2003 Patriot League men's basketball tournament was played at The Show Place Arena in Upper Marlboro, Maryland and Hart Center in Worcester, Massachusetts after the conclusion of the 2002–03 regular season. Top seed Holy Cross defeated #2 seed , 72–64 in the championship game, to win its third straight (4th overall) Patriot League Tournament title. The Crusaders earned an automatic bid to the 2003 NCAA tournament as #14 seed in the Midwest region.

Format
All eight league members participated in the tournament, with teams seeded according to regular season conference record.

Bracket

References

Tournament
Patriot League men's basketball tournament
Patriot League men's basketball tournament
Patriot League men's basketball tournament
Patriot League men's basketball tournament